Allerød may refer to:

 Allerød Municipality, a municipality in Denmark
 Lillerød, also called Allerød, seat of the municipality
 Allerød station, a railway station in the Danish town
 Allerød oscillation, a climatic period at the end of the last glaciation